San Vito (Sardinian: Santu Idu or Santu Bidu, from Saint Vitus)  is a comune (municipality) in the Province of South Sardinia in the Italian region Sardinia, located about  northeast of Cagliari.

San Vito borders the following municipalities: Burcei, Castiadas, Muravera, Sinnai, Villaputzu, Villasalto.

It is the birthplace of launeddas player Luigi Lai.

References 

Cities and towns in Sardinia